Jack Thomson (born 22 January 1929) is a former Australian rules footballer who played with Melbourne in the Victorian Football League (VFL).

Notes

External links 
	

	
		
1929 births
Living people
Australian rules footballers from Victoria (Australia)		
Melbourne Football Club players